Senapati fortress was built by Senapati, the grandson of Chhatrasal in 1700 AD in Kulpahar on a hill, at the western end of the city. This fort was dismantled by the British in 1804 AD.

See also
 Senapati Mahal

Forts in Uttar Pradesh
Bundelkhand
Tourist attractions in Mahoba district
Rajput architecture